Bragevägen Railway Stop (in Swedish Bragevägens hållplats) used to be a railway stop at Djursholmsbanan, a part of Roslagsbanan which was discontinued in 1976. The station was situated at the road cross of Bragevägen and Valevägen in Djursholm, next to Djursholms församlingsgård. When coming from Stockholm Ö, it was the first stop after Djursholms Ösby and was followed by Djursholms Sveavägen.

Station code: Bvg

References

Disused railway stations in Sweden
Metropolitan Stockholm
Stockholm urban area
Railway stations closed in 1976